This is a list of the rolling stock operated by the Austrian Federal Railways (ÖBB), including retired classes.

Steam locomotives

Tenders

Electric locomotives

Diesel locomotives

Steam railcars

Electrical multiple units

Diesel railcar

Maintenance of way equipment

External links 
Das Digitale Eisenbahn Fotoarchiv DEF
The Railfaneurope.net Picture Gallery
Bahnbilder.de
eisenbahn-in-oesterreich.at - Locomotive photographs (German)

Austrian Federal Railways
!